The following is a list of Malayalam films released in the year 2004.

Dubbed films 

 2004
2004
Lists of 2004 films by country or language
 Mal